AAG TV was a youth entertainment channel in Pakistan, owned by Independent Media Corporation. Launched in 2006 by Geo Television Network, it was associated with Fire Records, a record label in Pakistan. Certain notable artists within the Pakistani music industry were signed by Fire Records. In 2013, Aag TV shut down in the United Kingdom and Ireland, and was replaced by Geo Tez.

VJ shows 
12 se 2
3 To 5
7,20
AAG 10
AAG Exclusive
Azfar Mani Show
Baji Online
Blog Buster
Cell 224
Curtain Call
Click Teen
Covers
Dreamers
Drift 360
Ishrat Baji
Fire Starter
Fireworks
Fire Station
Hun Das (live)
Super Duper Gana (live)
Iqbal Ka Pakistan
VJ Mix
VIPs Only
Meter TV
Meter Down
Milk Shiekh
Pick a Choose
Papoo Yaar
Thori Si Siyasat
Weekend with Mahira Khan

See also 
 List of music channels in Pakistan
 GEO News
 GEO Super
 List of Pakistani television stations

References

External links 

 Official site

  

Geo TV
Television stations in Karachi
Foreign television channels broadcasting in the United Kingdom